Bathinda Lok Sabha constituency is one of the 13 Lok Sabha (parliamentary) constituencies of Punjab state in northern India. In 17th Lokh Sabh, it is represented by Harsimart Kaur Badal. She has been representing Bathinda Lok Sabha Constituency in Lok Sabha since 2009. In general election of 2009, Harsimrat Kaur defeated  Yuvraj Raninder singh (Son of Captain Amarinder Singh) with margin of 1,20,948 votes. In 2014`s general election she defeated Manpreet Singh Badal with margin of 19,395 votes and in 2019, Amarinder Singh Raja warring lost to Harsimart Kaur Badal with a margin of 21,722 votes.

Vidhan Sabha segments
Bathinda Lok Sabha constituency comprises 9 Vidhan Sabha (legislative assembly) constituencies. For 2012 assembly elections, some of the segments were redrawn.  Maur, Bhucho Mandi, Bathinda Rural, and Talwandi Sabo are the new constituencies.

Members of Lok Sabha

Election Results

2019

2014 16th Lok Sabha

2009

1957
 Two candidates were elected from Bathinda, formerly spelt Bhatinda, in 1957. 
First Seat (Reserved for SC candidates) 
 Hukam Singh (INC) : 257,692 votes   
 Teja Singh (CPI) : 185,496 (Lost by 72,000 votes)
Second Seat (Reserved for SC candidates)
 Ajit Singh (INC) : 218,742 votes
 Ram Singh (CPI) : 145,310 (lost by 73,000 votes)

See also
 Bathinda district
 List of Constituencies of the Lok Sabha
 Mansa district

Notes

External links
Bathinda lok sabha  constituency election 2019 result details

Lok Sabha constituencies in Punjab, India
Bathinda district
Mansa district, India